Kokkadichcholai massacre may refer to: 

Prawn farm massacre, a 1987 massacre of Tamil workers in Kokkadichcholai by Sri Lankan police
1991 Kokkadichcholai massacre, a massacre of Tamil civilians by Sri Lankan soldiers

Massacres in Sri Lanka